Constance DeJong (born 1950) is a visual artist who works in the margin between sculpture and painting/drawing. Her predominate medium is metal with light as a dominant factor. She is currently working in New Mexico and is a professor of sculpture at the University of New Mexico. DeJong received a National Endowment for the Arts Visual Art Fellowship in 1982. In 2003, she had a retrospective at the Albuquerque Museum of Art and History. That same year, Constance DeJong: Metal was published and released by University of New Mexico Press. Her work has been described by American art critic Dave Hickey as "work worth seeing and thinking about under any circumstances".

Collections 
Works by Constance DeJong can be found in the Albuquerque Museum of Art and History, New Mexico; the New Mexico Museum of Art, New Mexico; The Albright-Knox Art Gallery, Buffalo, New York; the Fisher Landau Center for Art, Long Island City, New York, the Scottsdale Museum of Contemporary Art, and the Clay Center for Arts and Sciences, Charleston, West Virginia.

Museum Exhibitions 

1980 American Crafts Museum, NYC, “Young Americans: Metal” Catalog,    (group)

1982 Sweeney Center, Santa Fe, New Mexico, “New Mexico In Three Dimensions” catalog, (group) Traveling to: Sheldon Memorial Art Gallery, University of Nebraska, Lincoln; Spiva Art Center, Joplin, Montana; Sioux City Arts Center, Iowa;Abilene Fine Arts Museum, Texas; Tyler Art Museum, Houston, Texas

1984 Roswell Museum and Art Center, New Mexico, “1984 Invitational Exhibition” Catalog, (group)

1985 Fox Fine Arts Center, University of Texas, El Paso, “Five From New Mexico” (group)

1987 Museum of Fine Arts, Santa Fe, New Mexico, “New Mexico ‘87” Catalog,    (group)

1989 University of New Mexico Art Museum, Jonson Gallery, Albuquerque,    “Constance DeJong” 1989, catalog  (solo)

1991 Mulvane Art Museum, Washburn University, Topeka, Kansas, "The Plane Truth” Catalog,  (3 person) Museum of Fine Arts, Museum of New Mexico, Santa Fe, “Singular Visions" Catalog, (group)

University of New Mexico Art Museum, Jonson Gallery, Albuquerque, “Abstract Art” Catalog, (group)

1993 University Art Museum, University of New Mexico, Albuquerque, "Art Of This Century”, Catalog, (group)

1995 Albuquerque Museum, New Mexico, “Common Ground 95” (group)

1996 Museum of Fine Arts, Museum of New Mexico, Santa Fe, “Curatorial Collections” Acquisitions To The Historic, Contemporary, And Photographic Collections” (group)

SITE Santa Fe, New Mexico, “Contemporary New Mexico Artists: Sketches And Schemas” Book, (group) Traveling to Sheldon Memorial Art Gallery, University of Nebraska, Lincoln

1998 Cedar Rapids Museum of Art, Iowa, “Albuquerque, Santa Fe, Taos”,    Catalog, (group)

1999 University Art Museum, University of New Mexico, Albuquerque, “The Minimalist Tradition in New Mexico”, Catalog, (group)

2001 Museum of Fine Arts, Museum of New Mexico, Santa Fe,    “Organizing The World: Sculptural Interventions” (group)

2003 Albuquerque Museum, New Mexico, “Constance DeJong: Sculpture and Drawings, a Retrospective” 2003-2004  (retrospective)

2005 The Albright-Knox Art Gallery, Buffalo, New York, “The Natalie and Irving Forman Collection”, Catalog (group)

Tucson Museum of Art, Arizona, "Paint on Metal”, catalog (group)

2006 Museum of Fine Arts, Museum of New Mexico, Santa Fe, “Constellations”    (three person)

2008 The Albright-Knox Art Gallery, Buffalo, New York, “Works on paper”    (group)

2010 Fisher Landau Center for Art, Long Island City, New York, “Unforgettable”  (group)

New Mexico Museum of Art, Santa Fe, New Mexico, “Case Studies from the Bureau of Contemporary Art” (group)

2011 The Albright-Knox Art Gallery, Buffalo, New York, “The Long Curve” Book,(group)

2012 Scottsdale Museum of Contemporary Art, Arizona, “Economy of Means:    Toward Humility in Contemporary Sculpture” (group)

The Albright-Knox Art Gallery, Buffalo, New York, “DECADE:Contemporary Collecting 2002–2012” Book (group)

New Mexico Museum of Art, Santa Fe, New Mexico, “It’s About Time” (group)

2013 New Mexico Museum of Art, Santa Fe, New Mexico, “Collecting Is Curiosity/Inquiry” (group)

2015 New Mexico Museum of Art, “Hunting and Gathering”, Santa Fe, (group)

Albuquerque Museum, New Mexico, “Visualizing Albuquerque” (group)

University Art Museum, University of New Mexico, Albuquerque, “This Art is Not Mine” (group)

2017 Scottsdale Museum of Contemporary Art, Arizona,  “The Kindness of Strangers: Recent Acquisitions and Conservation Projects” (group)

References

External links 
 Constance DeJong web page

1950 births
American women artists
Artists from New Mexico
University of New Mexico faculty
Living people
American women academics
21st-century American women artists